Pothan Joseph (1892–1972) was a journalist in 20th-century India whose career spanned the twenty years before and twenty years after India's independence. He worked with notable people of the time such as Muhammad Ali Jinnah, Annie Besant, Mahatma Gandhi, Sarojini Naidu, and Motilal Nehru. He was the first to write a daily political column for five decades, called 'Over A Cup of Tea', sprinkled with Biblical and Dickensian quotes. He also discovered and nurtured the Indian cartoonist Shankar, helping to make political cartoons a staple of newspapers.

Joseph started or developed 26 newspapers. These included the Hindustan Times, the Indian Express, and the Deccan Herald.  He was the first editor of Dawn in 1942 while it was based in New Delhi.  He left Dawn to take a position with the government.

Pothan Joseph guarded editorial freedom and demanded that editors support those who worked in the editorial wing and never encroach on their freedom. Even before unionization, Pothan also pleaded for proper payment to deserving journalists. His motto during his working life was "courage, vigilance and fidelity".

Biography

Early life and education 

Pothan Joseph was born on 13 March 1892, to C.I. Joseph of Oorayil House, Chengannur, Kerala, India. He graduated with a degree in Physics from Presidency College in Madras (Chennai), and then took his LL.B. degree in law from the University of Bombay. He quickly abandoned ideas of a legal career, became a writer for the Hyderabad Bulletin and finally found his calling when he joined The Bombay Chronicle in 1918, then edited by B.G. Horniman.

Honors 
Joseph served as the president of the Indian Federation of Working Journalists for numerous years. As a rule he shunned formal accolades, saying, "what is the use of moss to a rolling stone?" He was posthumously awarded the Padma Bhushan, one of India's highest civilian honors, in 1973.

References

External links 
 Prof. J.V. Vilanilam, Former Vice-Chancellor, University of Kerala, in Media Mimosa 2008 January — March 2008, pages 89–93.
 T.J.S. George. Pothan Joseph's India. A Biography. First published in 1992 by Sanchar Publishing House, New Delhi  and printed by Allied Publishers Limited, New Delhi. A revised edition, under the title Lessons in Journalism: The Story of Pothan Joseph, was published in 2007 by Viva Books, New Delhi.  .
 cartoonist K. Shankar Pillai
 Joseph Family Website
 A lecture series is established as a tribute to legendary journalist Pothan Joseph is part of the Journalism Mentor, India's first mentorship-based journalism course. It is a 14- month program designed for those who are interested in pursuing journalism as a career: Lecture Series.
 He was posthumously award India's civilian Padma Bhushan award in 1973 for Literature and Education: Padma Bhushan Awards (1970–1979).
 History of Oorayil family
 History of Thulasserymanapurathu, a family that migrated from west Asia to Kerala (Kollam) in the ninth century AD

1892 births
1972 deaths
Journalists from Kerala
Malayali people
Recipients of the Padma Bhushan in literature & education
People from Alappuzha district
Dawn (newspaper) editors
Indian Christian writers